Prunus herthae is a species of plant in the family Rosaceae. It is endemic to Ecuador.

References

Sources

Flora of Ecuador
herthae
Data deficient plants
Taxonomy articles created by Polbot